The 1927–28 Northern Football League season was the 35th in the history of the Northern Football League, a football competition in Northern England.

Clubs

The league featured 13 clubs which competed in the last season, along with one new club:
 Chilton Colliery Recreation Athletic

League table

References

1927-28
4